Seland is a surname. Notable people with the surname include:

Arve Seland (born 1963), Norwegian footballer
Gudmund Seland (1907–1996), Norwegian resistance member and newspaper editor
Hans Seland (1867–1949), Norwegian politician and author
Johannes Seland (1912–1999), Norwegian politician 
Karstein Seland (1912–2005), Norwegian politician
Tone Anne Alvestad Seland, Norwegian handball player